The 1933 Cincinnati Reds season was a season in American baseball. The team finished eighth and last in the National League with a record of 58–94, 33 games behind the New York Giants.

Offseason 
The Reds hired Larry MacPhail as chief executive and general manager during the off-season. MacPhail had previously purchased an interest in the Columbus Red Birds, a minor league affiliate of the St. Louis Cardinals before being hired by the Reds after being recommended for the position by Cardinals general manager Branch Rickey.

Following two consecutive last place finishes with a combined record of 177-285, the Reds replaced manager Dan Howley. The club hired Donie Bush as his replacement for the 1933 season. Bush had previous managerial experience, as in 1923, he was a player/manager with the Washington Senators, leading the club to a 75-78 record and a fourth-place finish in the American League. Bush was the manager of the Pittsburgh Pirates from 1927-1929, leading them to the National League pennant in 1927 with a 94-60 record. Bush also managed the Chicago White Sox from 1930-31.

On November 30, the Reds traded away outfielder Babe Herman to the Chicago Cubs, getting pitcher Bob Smith, catcher Rollie Hemsley, outfielder Johnny Moore and outfielder Lance Richbourg. Smith had a 4-3 record with a 4.61 ERA in 34 games with the Cubs in 1932. Hemsley split the 1932 season between the Cubs and the Pittsburgh Pirates, batting .289 with three home runs and 32 RBI in 76 games split between the two clubs. Moore had a .305 batting average with 13 home runs and 64 RBI in 119 games, and Richbourg hit .257 with a home run and 21 RBI in 44 games.

On December 17, Cincinnati and the St. Louis Cardinals made a trade, in which the Reds traded pitcher Ownie Carroll and outfielder Estel Crabtree in exchange for first baseman Jim Bottomley. Bottomley hit .296 with 11 home runs and 48 RBI in 91 games with the Cardinals during the 1932 season. During his career with St. Louis, Bottomley hit .325 with 181 home runs and 1105 RBI in 1392 games since the 1922 season. Bottomley won the National League Most Valuable Player award in 1928 when he hit .325 with a league leading 31 home runs and 136 RBI and 20 triples in 149 games. In 1925, Bottomley led the NL with 227 hits and 44 doubles, while in 1925, he again led the NL in doubles with 40, and in runs batted in with 120.

The Reds sold pitcher Al Eckert and outfielder Lance Richbourg to the St. Louis Cardinals on January 3, then on January 23, the Reds sold infielder Wally Gilbert to the Cardinals.

On February 4, the Reds purchased outfielder Harry Rice and pitcher Dutch Henry from the Minneapolis Millers of the American Association. In 1932, Rice hit .345 with 11 home runs with the Millers. He previously played in the American League, with his last season with the Washington Senators in 1931. Rice's best season in the AL was in 1925, as he finished fifth in American League Most Valuable Player voting after hitting .359 with 11 home runs and 47 RBI in 103 games with the St. Louis Browns.
Henry appeared in only 10 games with the Millers in 1932, going 2-4. In 1931 with Minneapolis, Henry had a 23-10 record with a 4.41 ERA in 50 games. Henry last played in the American League with the Chicago White Sox in 1930, struggling to a 2-17 record with a 4.88 ERA in 35 games. His best season was in 1927, as Henry posted a record of 11-6 with a 4.23 ERA with the New York Giants.

Regular season 
The rebuilding Reds got off to a mediocre start to the season, going 8-8 in their first 16 games to sit in a tie for third place, 4.5 games behind the pennant leading Pittsburgh Pirates. On May 6, the Reds signed 48 year old free agent pitcher Jack Quinn. Quinn, who began his major league career with the New York Highlanders in 1909, had pitched with the Brooklyn Dodgers in 1932, going 3-7 with a 3.30 ERA in 42 games.

The Reds made a trade on May 7, trading shortstop Leo Durocher and pitchers Dutch Henry and Jack Ogden to the St. Louis Cardinals for infielder Sparky Adams and pitchers Paul Derringer and Allyn Stout. At the time of the trade, Adams was hitting .167 in eight games with the Cardinals. In 1931, Adams led the National League with 46 doubles. Derringer was 0-2 with a 4.24 ERA in three games with St. Louis in 1933. In 1931, Derringer was 18-8 with a league best .692 winning percentage with the Cardinals. Stout had appeared in one game with St. Louis, pitching a scoreless two innings. In 1931, Stout went 6-0 with a 4.21 ERA in 30 games.

Cincinnati continued to hover around the .500 mark through the middle of June, as after a 6-5 win over the St. Louis Cardinals in the second game of a doubleheader on June 18, the Reds had a record of 28-29, sitting in fifth place and 7 games behind the pennant leading New York Giants. The team then went 6-18 in their next 24 games, falling to 34-47 and into last place in the NL on July 11. Cincinnati released struggling infielder Andy High on this date, then two days later, the team released pitcher Jack Quinn.

As the season went on, the losses continued to pile on, as the Reds finished in last place for the third consecutive season with a record of 58-94, 33 games behind the pennant winning New York Giants and two games behind the seventh place Philadelphia Phillies. The Reds attendance dropped by nearly 150,000 fans from the 1932 season, as Cincinnati drew 218,281 fans, their lowest total since the 1918 season.

Outfielder Chick Hafey led the team with a .303 batting average, while hitting seven home runs and 62 RBI in 144 games. Hafey led Cincinnati with 172 hits. First baseman Jim Bottomley hit .250 with a team high 13 home runs and 83 RBI in 145 games, his first season with the club. Catcher Ernie Lombardi hit .283 with four home runs and 47 RBI in 107 games.

Paul Derringer, who was acquired early in the season in a trade with the St. Louis Cardinals, had a record of 7-25 with a team best 3.23 ERA and 85 strikeouts in 33 games. Derringer, who lost two games with St. Louis, led the National League with 27 losses in 1933. Red Lucas went 10-16 with a 3.40 ERA while throwing a team high 21 complete games, while Larry Benton tied Lucas for the team lead in wins, as he was 10-11 with a 3.71 ERA in 34 games. Eppa Rixey had a record of 6-3 with a 3.15 ERA in 16 games as a 42 year old.

Season standings

Record vs. opponents

Notable transactions 
 July 31, 1933: Bob Smith was selected off waivers from the Reds by the Boston Braves.

Roster

Player stats

Batting

Starters by position 
Note: Pos = Position; G = Games played; AB = At bats; H = Hits; Avg. = Batting average; HR = Home runs; RBI = Runs batted in

Other batters 
Note: G = Games played; AB = At bats; H = Hits; Avg. = Batting average; HR = Home runs; RBI = Runs batted in

Pitching

Starting pitchers 
Note: G = Games pitched; IP = Innings pitched; W = Wins; L = Losses; ERA = Earned run average; SO = Strikeouts

Other pitchers 
Note: G = Games pitched; IP = Innings pitched; W = Wins; L = Losses; ERA = Earned run average; SO = Strikeouts

Relief pitchers 
Note: G = Games pitched; W = Wins; L = Losses; SV = Saves; ERA = Earned run average; SO = Strikeouts

Farm system

References

External links
1933 Cincinnati Reds season at Baseball Reference

Cincinnati Reds seasons
Cincinnati Reds season
Cincinnati Reds